The Ayawaso West by-election took place on 31 January 2019 after the death of the incumbent MP Emmanuel Kyeremateng Agyarko on 21 November 2018. Lydia Alhassan of the New Patriotic Party was elected with 69% of the vote.

Violence
Violence erupted in the area of the La-Bawaleshie polling station two hours after the election had started, though there was no death recorded there where casualties. Ningo-Prampram MP Sam George was assaulted and 18 people were wounded by gunshot. According to YEN.com, the perpetrators were masked men, and alleged to be National Security Operatives. YEN.com.

Result

Commission 
In February 2020, a 3-member commission was established by the GoG to investigate into the violence during the by-election. It was claimed to be set-up by Mahamudu Bawumia with the permission of Nana Akufo-Addo.

See also 

 Ejura Shooting

References

2019 in Ghana
By-elections in Ghana